The 2020–21 European Rugby Champions Cup pool stage is the first stage of the 26th season of European club rugby union, and the seventh under the European Rugby Champions Cup format. Due to the COVID-19 pandemic delaying the end of the previous tournament, twenty-four clubs from the three major European domestic and regional leagues would compete in the Champions Cup in a one-year exceptional basis. EPCR chief Vincent Gaillard confirmed the 24-team tournament in August 2020.

The competition was suspended on 11 January 2021.

Seeding 
For the purposes of the pool draw, the 24 clubs were separated into tiers based on their league finishing position, and clubs from the same league in the same tier were not drawn into the same pool. The number 1 and number 2 ranked clubs from each league are in Tier 1, the number 3 and number 4 ranked clubs are in Tier 2, the number 5 and 6 ranked clubs are in Tier 3, and the number 7 and number 8 ranked clubs are in Tier 4.

Pool play will feature the Tier 1 teams playing the Tier 4 teams in their pool (that are not from the same league) twice in a home and away manner, while the Tier 2 and 3 clubs will follow in a similar manner.

The four teams from each pool with the best points will qualify for the knockout stage. Teams finishing 5th through 8th after pool play will join the Challenge Cup at the round of 16 stage (joining eight qualifiers from the Challenge Cup pool stage) In total, eight weekends of play will be provided for, one less than in previous seasons.

Pool stage 
The draw took place on 28 October 2020, at the Maison du Sport International in Lausanne, Switzerland.

Teams in the same pool play two other teams twice, at home and away, in the group stage that began on the weekend of 11–13 December 2020, and ended prematurely on  18–20 December 2020. The top four teams in each pool progress to the quarter finals, with the teams ranked 5-8 progressing to the 2020–21 European Rugby Challenge Cup round of 16.

Teams are awarded group points based on match performances. Four points are awarded for a win, two points for a draw, one attacking bonus point for scoring four or more tries in a match and one defensive bonus point for losing a match by seven points or fewer.

In the event of a tie between two or more teams, the following tie-breakers are used, as directed by EPCR:

 Where teams have played each other
 The club with the greater number of competition points from only matches involving tied teams.
 If equal, the club with the best aggregate points difference from those matches.
 If equal, the club that scored the most tries in those matches.
 Where teams remain tied and/or have not played each other in the competition (i.e. are from different pools)
 The club with the best aggregate points difference from the pool stage.
 If equal, the club that scored the most tries in the pool stage.
 If equal, the club with the fewest players suspended in the pool stage.
 If equal, the drawing of lots will determine a club's ranking.

(C) denotes the team has qualified for the Champions Cup quarter-finals

(Q) denotes the team has qualified for the Challenge Cup quarter-finals

(q) denotes team has at least qualified for the quarter-finals of one of the tournaments

Pool A

Round 1

Round 2 

The pool stage was temporarily suspended following round 2. It was later confirmed that rounds 3 and 4 would not take place.

Pool B

Round 1

Round 2 

The competition was temporarily suspended following round 2.  It was later confirmed that rounds 3 and 4 would not take place.

See also 

 2020–21 European Rugby Challenge Cup

Notes

References

European Rugby Champions Cup pool stages
Pool